Mashak-e Sepahdari (also Romanized as Māshak-e Sepahdārī; also known as Māshak, Māshak-e Şafādārī, Māshak-e Tehrānī, and Moshak) is a village in Kurka Rural District, in the Central District of Astaneh-ye Ashrafiyeh County, Gilan Province, Iran. At the 2006 census, its population was 396, in 119 families.

References 

Populated places in Astaneh-ye Ashrafiyeh County